Zhang Xindi is a Chinese curler.

She was alternate for the Chinese team at the 2010 Ford World Women's Curling Championship in Swift Current, Canada.

References

External links
 

Chinese female curlers
Living people
Year of birth missing (living people)